Charles Downing Lay (September 3, 1877 – February 15, 1956) was an American landscape architect.

Early life and family estate
The son of Oliver Ingraham Lay, a professional painter, and Hester Marian Wait Lay, Charles Downing Lay was born in Newburgh, New York. At age 7, Lay began spending summers with his grandmother in Stratford, Connecticut. Lay spent much of his childhood in Stratford fishing, sailing, and swimming and developed a great appreciation for nature. The Housatonic, along with the Long Island Sound, would greatly influence the course of Lay's career.

Lay inherited his grandmother's estate, the land he first fell in love with, in 1900 and he remained there until his death in 1956. The property was not extensive and although the landscape was informal, there was little to suggest a truly naturalistic landscape. Walls, ramps, and steps with planting occupied the slope between houses, with interesting plants planted in a casual manner. There was little space between the houses and the country road to the north; the outdoor living areas were focused on the south view toward Long Island. These areas were bounded by old stone walls with large lawns and perennial borders surrounding the grounds. Always planning further improvements, he often experimented in growing new plants. In 1947, shortly before retirement, Lay bought  in Lyme, Connecticut, near Selden Creek, where he spent time with his wife and family during the summers.  He described this land as "farm grown to woods which I subconsciously had been longing for."

Education and career

Lay attended the School of Architecture at Columbia University from 1896 to 1900 before transferring to Harvard University's School of Landscape Architecture, from which he graduated in 1902, the second man to achieve a Bachelor of Science degree in the field. The first, Henry Hubbard, had been Lay's teacher when Lay was working on his M.L.A. in 1906-1908 and in 1910, Hubbard and Lay, in partnership with Robert Wheelwright, opened a landscape architecture firm in New York City. They practiced under the name Lay, Hubbard, and Wheelwright and began publishing the professional journal Landscape Architecture in October 1910. In 1911, the journal was named the official publication of the American Society of Landscape Architects, a title it still holds today. Lay served as an editor and manager until 1921.

Aware of significant population growth in American cities during the early 20th-century, Lay became increasingly concerned with the availability of urban outdoor space. He worked for New York City's Parks Department from 1913 to 1914 and proposed improvements to Albany, New York. During World War I, Lay was a planner for the United States Housing Corporation and served as a consultant on the planning and development of Navy air and service stations during World War II. In addition to a wide variety of commissions from private clients, Lay designed public parks in New York City; Albany; Troy, New York; Schenectady, New York; Brooklyn; Washington, D.C.; and Stratford, Connecticut; well as for the United States Housing Corporation in Erie, Pennsylvania and Butler, Pennsylvania. Building on his interest in urban planning, he developed some of the first subdivisions in suburban New York, Massachusetts, Rhode Island, and Connecticut. Interested in providing greater access to outdoor space for citizens of New York City, Lay also completed a study for a Nassau County, New York, park system, which now numbers 83 parks. In addition to his other accomplishments, Lay received a silver medal from the 1936 Berlin Olympics for his work on Marine Park in Brooklyn.

Projects

Charles Downing Lay designed or contributed to the design of countless parks, subdivisions, private estates, and gardens throughout the United States, although his influence was most apparent on the East Coast.

Some of his major projects include:
Marine Park, Brooklyn
Battery Park, New York City
Bryant Park, New York City
John Jay Park, New York City
Madison Square Park, New York City
Initial design of the grounds for the National Academy of Sciences, Washington, D.C.

Legacy

In his professional writings and landscape practice, Lay frequently advocated for a closer relationship between man and nature and argued that natural resources could be beneficial for society if not misused. His lifelong love for the landscape around Statford, Connecticut, led Lay to found the Housatonic Valley Conference in 1937, later renamed the Housatonic Valley Association. The HVA now protects all  of the tri-state region known as the Housatonic River Valley.

Timeline
1877: September 3 Born, Newburgh, New York
1896–1900: Attends Columbia University, School of Architecture
1900–1902: Attends Harvard University- S.B. in Landscape Architecture
1904: Studied under Mahonri Young, Allen Tucker, and Gifford Beal in independent practice
1910: Founds Hubbard, Lay and Wheelwright with Henry V. Hubbard and Robert Wheelwright
1910–1921: Serves an editor and manager of Landscape Architecture magazine
1913–1914: Employed by City of New York, Department of Parks
1924: Designs initial plans for grounds at National Academy of Sciences in Washington D.C.
1917–1919: Works as planner for United States Housing Corporation (World War I)
Plans for improvements of Albany, New York
Designs Marine Park, Brooklyn
1934: Receives Oberlaender Trust grant to study public recreation in Germanic countries
1936: Wins silver medal for plans for Marine Park at the 11th Olympiad in Berlin
1937: Founds Housatonic Valley Conference
1939: Consults on landscape of the New York World's Fair
1941–1945: Consults on naval air and service stations (World War II)
1945: Elected into the National Academy of Design
1956 February 15: Dies

See also
Landscape architecture
History of gardening
New York City
Park

References

External links
Guide to the Charles Downing Lay Papers. Held by the Division of Rare and Manuscript Collections, Cornell University Library.
National Academy of Sciences
Nassau County
Oliver Ingraham Lay, artist. "Charles Downing Lay, Portrait of the Artist's Son."
Housatonic Valley Association 
The Library of Congress, American Memory: American Landscape and Architectural Design 1850-1920.
The NAS Building
Olympic Medalists in Art Competitions
"The Rebirth of New York City's Bryant Park."

1877 births
1956 deaths
19th-century American architects
20th-century American architects
Academic journal editors
American landscape architects
American print editors
American urban planners
Architects from Connecticut
Architects from New York (state)
Columbia Graduate School of Architecture, Planning and Preservation alumni
Harvard Graduate School of Design alumni
Medalists at the 1936 Summer Olympics
National Academy of Design members
Olympic competitors in art competitions
Olympic silver medalists in art competitions
People from Lyme, Connecticut 
People from Newburgh, New York
People from Stratford, Connecticut